There are currently 399 railway stations in the Netherlands including four which are used only during special events and one which serves the National Railway Museum only. NS Stations is the body which manages and owns all railway stations in the Netherlands.

Categories

Stations are divided into two categories based upon the service they receive. These are, in order of decreasing importance:
 Intercity stations, where usually all trains (except, in some cases, international services) call.
 The remaining stations, where only local trains (Sprinters) call.
There are exceptions to this categorization. Some local trains – despite being called stoptreinen – do not stop at all stations: two examples are the services from Groningen to Roodeschool and from Tiel to Arnhem.

On the route diagrams printed at the top of station departure sheets, intercity stations are indicated by the letters IC.

ProRail classifies stations into five categories based upon the facilities available. The categories are (in English): Cathedral, Mega, Plus, Basic and  Stop.

Naming conventions
Stations are generally named after the town they serve. In cases where a town is served by more than one station, additional designations specify the station's status or location, for example:
Centraal (abbreviated "CS"): "Central" – a town's most important station with more than 40,000 daily passengers.
Centrum: "Centre" – a town's most important station with, however, fewer than 40,000 daily passengers, and/or a centrally located station.
Zuid: "South"
Noord: "North"
Oost: "East"
West: "West"
A specific locality within the town, e.g. Amsterdam Sloterdijk railway station.

In the converse situation, where one station serves two communities, both community names are given, separated by a hyphen, e.g. Krommenie-Assendelft.

As of 15 December 2019 eight stations are designated Centraal. They are: Amsterdam Centraal, Amersfoort Centraal, Arnhem Centraal, Den Haag Centraal, Eindhoven Centraal, Leiden Centraal, Rotterdam Centraal, and Utrecht Centraal.

List of stations, with their official abbreviations

Platforms and tracks
Not the platforms, but the tracks are numbered. In Dutch communication, NS refers to "spoor 1" ("track 1"), etc. while in English communication, NS refers to "platform 1" where "track 1" is meant (hence all island platforms have two numbers). Tracks without platform access, used for through traffic, also have a number. This number is not indicated, but it shows indirectly by the fact that in the numbering of the accessible tracks a number is skipped. Track numbers are usually increasing in the direction away from the centre of the city and hence away from the main entrance(s) of the station.

A track along a long platform may have an "a" and a "b"-side, and sometimes three sections "a", "b" and "c".

At many stations, above platforms and at their access points, there are dynamic displays (electronic displays) of the destination and departure time of the next train

Machines and counters for train tickets
For checking in and out with an OV-chipkaart card readers are at station entrances, halls and/or platforms. It can be recharged (increasing the credit by paying an amount) at ticket machines. The anonymous variety of the card can also be purchased here. For some minor rail operators all this does not apply yet.

Paper tickets are available from the same ticket machines; at the counter (if available) a supplement of €0.50 per ticket (with a maximum of €1 per occasion) has to be paid. In both cases one can choose a dated or undated ticket; the latter can be useful if one has not decided yet about the travel date. If the ticket is not dated it requires a stamp from a stamp machine on the travel date.

With an e-ticket bought in advance for a specific journey one can just get on the train without any further validation of the ticket.

NS Stations

NS Stations is a Dutch company that manages and exploits all railway stations in the Netherlands.

Safety and comfort
Passenger comfort sometimes suffers from (homeless) beggars or pickpockets, especially in large cities. Measures taken to remedy this include installation of CCTV, locking waiting rooms in the evening, and sometimes removal of benches from station halls. Also, a valid train ticket is required to access platforms, at many stations enforced by gates that require an OV-chipkaart to activate them. Passengers with large luggage should note that no luggage trolleys are provided (except at the station of Schiphol airport), although platforms are accessible by elevator.

Station abbreviations
The official abbreviations of names of stations are used internally by the NS, but also on handwritten tickets; they can also conveniently be used when entering a station in the NS planner and are needed in some URLs, see below. In a station it can be found in the lower right corner of the yellow departure schedules. In most URLs (see below) they have to be written in lowercase, in some a capital is optional. On the departure schedules they are written in lowercase. In other cases the abbreviations are written with a capital letter.

Stations also have a four-digit code that is used on the keypad of older ticket machines to specify a destination.

History

See also
 Amsterdam Metro
 List of Rotterdam metro stations
 List of busiest railway stations in the Netherlands
 Train routes in the Netherlands
 Trains in the Netherlands
 Transport in the Netherlands

References

External links

 Station info:
http://www.ns.nl/reizigers/reisinformatie/stationsvoorzieningen Includes departure schedules and maps. For other stations, change "asd" in the URL or enter their name or code at the bottom of the page. The schedules are displayed on the stations in the same format, but in characteristic yellow (or blue in the case of temporary versions). The station abbreviation is shown in the lower right corner.
 http://www.swopnet.com/waypoints/gps/netherlands5.xls - Excel file with stations, official abbreviations and coordinates.
 http://www.amsterdamtips.com/tips/train-network-map-amsterdam.php - map of stations in and around Amsterdam
 http://www.prisman.nl/rvm/pic/rvm415.gif (map of rail network nodes) and http://www.prisman.nl/rvm/B041.htm (list of nodes with adjacent nodes)
 Demo of the ticket machines installed at every station: http://www.ns.nl/kaartautomaatdemo/

Photos
 Stationsweb: photos and info (in Dutch but easy in use) on current and old stations
 Langs de rails: photos and info on current stations and Dutch trains
 The European Railway Server: The European Railway Server, section on Dutch stations (photos)

Maps
 Schematic maps of all tracks, switches and platforms: http://www.sporenplan.nl/html_nl/sporenplan/ns/ns_normaal/start.html
Zoomable map of all tracks and stations, updated for 2009: http://www.trein-kaart.nl/
 http://www.ns.nl/ :
 railway map with all stations: search for spoorkaart
 maps of station surroundings and station lay-out of some stations: select Nederland - Reisinformatie - Stationsvoorzieningen

 
Railway stations
Railway stations in the Netherlands by province